Michael Francis Davlin (November 2, 1927 – March 28, 1996) was an American football offensive tackle in the National Football League for the Washington Redskins.  He played college football at the University of Notre Dame and the University of San Francisco.

1927 births
1996 deaths
Sportspeople from Omaha, Nebraska
American football offensive tackles
Notre Dame Fighting Irish football players
San Francisco Dons football players
Washington Redskins players